The Senior Cup is the county cup for the Leicestershire and Rutland County Football Association (LRCFA). Entry to the competition is selected by the Competitions Committee of LRCFA and usually consists of Step 6 and 7 teams of the National League System. The current holders are Heather St John's who won the 2018-19 competition.

History

The LRCFA covers the ceremonial counties of Leicestershire and Rutland. The Senior Cup was founded in 1887 and was first won by Sheepshed FC, who defeated Mill Hill House by eight goals to nil in a replay. The first competition consisted of five rounds in total, including the final and was contested by seventeen clubs. Leicester City Reserves have appeared in a record thirty one finals, winning on twenty three occasions

Winners

Clubs shown in bold indicate their last win.

Finals

References

County Cup competitions
Football in Leicestershire
Football in Rutland